Anthony Snoti Laffor (born 17 February 1985) is a Liberian professional footballer who last played as a winger for South African side Chippa United.

Club career 
Born in Monrovia, Laffor has played club football in Liberia, Ghana, and South Africa for LISCR, Ashanti Gold, Jomo Cosmos, Supersport United and Mamelodi Sundowns.

He was released by Mamelodi Sundowns in December 2020.

In March 2021 he signed for Chippa United, leaving in July.

International career
He made his international debut for Liberia in 2003. In June 2012, Laffor was expelled from the squad ahead of a 2013 Africa Cup of Nations qualifier but later rejoined the team.

Career statistics

International
Scores and results list Liberia's goal tally first.

References

1985 births
Living people
Sportspeople from Monrovia
Liberian footballers
Liberia international footballers
LISCR FC players
Ashanti Gold SC players
Jomo Cosmos F.C. players
SuperSport United F.C. players
Mamelodi Sundowns F.C. players
Association football wingers
Liberian expatriate footballers
Liberian expatriate sportspeople in Ghana
Expatriate footballers in Ghana
Liberian expatriate sportspeople in South Africa
Expatriate soccer players in South Africa
Chippa United F.C. players